John "Jack" Greenwood (born 26 December 1943) is a former Australian rules footballer who played with Footscray and South Melbourne in the Victorian Football League (VFL).

Greenwood, a defender, had two stints in the VFL. He played at Footscray in 1963 and 1964, then spent some time with Daylesford.

In the 1967 VFL season he began playing for South Melbourne and appeared in all 18 games that year. He had knee surgery in 1968 and couldn't break into the team until round 17.

Greenwood transferred to Goulburn Valley Football League club Tatura in 1969 as playing coach and won back to back Morrison Medals in his first two seasons.

References

1943 births
Australian rules footballers from Victoria (Australia)
Western Bulldogs players
Sydney Swans players
Daylesford Football Club players
Tatura Football Club players
Living people